Supiori is an island of the Schouten Islands archipelago in Cenderawasih Bay, just west of Biak island in Papua Province, Western New Guinea, northeastern Indonesia.

Description
The island has a rugged terrain, largely covered in tropical rainforest.

Principal settlements include Korido on the south coast and Yenggarbun on the north coast. South of Supiori lie the small coral islands  Aruri (Insumbabi) and Rani. Before 1963, the island was part of the colonial Netherlands New Guinea. It comprises Supiori Regency within Papua Province.

History
The island was first sighted by Europeans by the Portuguese Jorge de Menezes in 1526. Menezes landed at Biak Islands, where he was forced to winter. One of the first sightings was also made by the Spanish navigator Álvaro de Saavedra on 24 June 1528, when trying to return from Tidore to New Spain. The Schoutens were charted as Islas de Oro (Golden Islands in Spanish).

Its sighting was again reported by Spanish navigator Íñigo Órtiz de Retes in 1545. It was charted as Los Martires by the Spaniards, possibly because it was where Spanish navigator Hernando de Grijalva was murdered by his mutinied crew.

References

Schouten Islands
Islands of Western New Guinea
Landforms of Papua (province)
Cenderawasih Bay
Biak–Numfoor rain forests
Islands of Oceania